Mario Antonio Cáceres Gómez (born 17 March 1981) is a Chilean former footballer who played as a striker.

During his career, he played for Colo-Colo on three occasions (being nicknamed "El Petrolero" in his country), but also plied his trade in four countries.

Club career
Born in the capital Santiago, Cáceres made his debut for Colo-Colo in 1998, but spent the following years on loan in the country, to Ñublense and Corporación Deportiva Everton de Viña del Mar respectively.

Caceres was signed by Sporting Clube de Portugal in January 2001, at the same time as compatriot Rodrigo Tello. Grossly unsettled he returned to Colo-Colo after just a few months, as the Lisbon club refused to activate the buying option it had on the player.

At the start of the 2004 season, Cáceres switched for C.D. Universidad de Concepción, but left the following year to Liga MX side Lobos de la BUAP.

Before the start of 2005's Apertura, Cáceres moved to another country, transferring to Greek team Aris FC, in the country's second level. In 2006, he rejoined Colo-Colo for a third stint, but returned to Greece and its division two the next year, with Pas Giannina FC.

Cáceres found some stability in the 2008 summer, going on to play two seasons at Switzerland's FC St. Gallen. Subsequently, he returned to his country, first joining San Luis de Quillota and going on to represent Audax Italiano, former team Everton and Deportes Temuco.

International career
Cáceres capped for Chile at under-20 level, appearing at both the 2001 South American U-20 Championship and the 2001 FIFA World Youth Championship. He also played for the nation at the 2004 CONMEBOL Pre-Olympic tournament.

Managerial career
He began his managerial career as an assistant coach in the Colo-Colo youth ranks and coach of Cobreloa at under-13 level. From 2018 to 2022, he worked as the assistant coach of Rodolfo Madrid in Rodelindo Román at minor categories of the Chilean football.

Personal life
His nickname, El Petrolero (The Oilman), was given by the Chilean play-by-play commentator Claudio Palma, due to the fact that he had a hard time picking up speed during the matches, like the diesel cars.

His brother, Carlos Cáceres Gómez, is a former footballer who played in Indonesia for PS Palembang and current football coach who has worked for clubs such as Cobresal (women).

In 2015, he worked as a football commentator for the Chilean TV sports channel Canal del Fútbol.

Honours

Club
 Colo-Colo
Primera División de Chile (3): 2002 Apertura, 2006 Apertura, 2006 Clausura
 Copa Sudamericana (1): Runner-up 2006

References

External links

1981 births
Living people
Footballers from Santiago
Chilean footballers
Chile youth international footballers
Chile under-20 international footballers
Association football forwards
Chilean Primera División players
Primera B de Chile players
Colo-Colo footballers
Ñublense footballers
Everton de Viña del Mar footballers
Universidad de Concepción footballers
Unión Española footballers
San Luis de Quillota footballers
Audax Italiano footballers
Deportes Temuco footballers
Primeira Liga players
Segunda Divisão players
Sporting CP B players
Sporting CP footballers
Liga MX players
Lobos BUAP footballers
Football League (Greece) players
Aris Thessaloniki F.C. players
PAS Giannina F.C. players
Swiss Super League players
Swiss Challenge League players
FC St. Gallen players
Chilean expatriate footballers
Expatriate footballers in Portugal
Expatriate footballers in Mexico
Expatriate footballers in Greece
Expatriate footballers in Switzerland
Chilean expatriate sportspeople in Portugal
Chilean expatriate sportspeople in Mexico
Chilean expatriate sportspeople in Greece
Chilean expatriate sportspeople in Switzerland
Chilean football managers
Chilean association football commentators